Quintus Aemilius Laetus (died 193) was a prefect of the Roman imperial bodyguard, known as the Praetorian Guard, from 191 until his death in 193. He acceded to this position upon the deaths of his predecessors Regillus and Lucius Julius Vehilius Gratus Julianus, by appointment of emperor Commodus. His name suggests that his family received Roman citizenship from Marcus Aemilius Lepidus.

When the behavior of Commodus turned increasingly erratic during the early 190s, Laetus is thought to have been implicated in the conspiracy that led to the emperor's murder on 31 December 192. The plot was a calculated attempt to advance the city prefect Publius Helvius Pertinax to the throne, but the assassination inadvertently initiated a period of civil war known as the Year of the Five Emperors, during which the Roman Empire witnessed five different claimants to the imperial power. The year opened with the brief reigns of Pertinax and Didius Julianus, before erupting to a full-scale war between the generals Pescennius Niger, Clodius Albinus, and Septimius Severus.

Although Laetus himself had been responsible for the accession of Pertinax, his claim to the imperial purple was opposed by the majority of the Praetorian Guard, forcing Pertinax to secure their support with an excessive promise of money. When he managed to pay only half of the promised sum, he was deserted by Laetus and killed by rogue Praetorians. In one of the most infamous episodes in Roman history, the guard then proceeded to sell the Empire by auction to Didius Julianus. In response, the armies of Pescennius Niger, Clodius Albinus and Septimius Severus rose in revolt, and marched on Rome. When his demise appeared imminent, Didius Julianus ordered the execution of Laetus and the conspirators against Commodus, on suspicion that they would side with Severus.

Media portrayals
 Laetus appears in the 2005 PlayStation 2 video game, Colosseum: Road to Freedom. He appears at first as a bodyguard for Commodus's mistress, but is later revealed to be the final boss of the game.
 A character named Quintus played by Tomas Arana appears in the movie Gladiator released in 2000 and is loosely based on Quintus Aemilius Laetus.  Quintus serves under Maximus in the opening battle scene.  He later sides with Commodus and arrests Maximus.  Quintus appears later as the commander of the Praetorian Guard.

Notes

References 

193 deaths
2nd-century Romans
Nerva–Antonine dynasty
Executed ancient Roman people
People executed by the Roman Empire
2nd-century executions
Praetorian prefects
People from Sfax
Executed Tunisian people
Laetus, Quintus
Year of birth unknown
Ancient murderers